This Town's Disaster is the first studio album by American indie rock band Blackpool Lights. Released in June 2006, it is the first album to be released on Curb Appeal Records, the indie record label co-founded and owned by the band's lead singer/guitarist Jim Suptic. The album was recorded a year before its release in 2005, but could not be released until Curb Appeal was fully functional.

Background
Much of the album was recorded in late spring/early summer 2005, during periods of time when lead singer/guitarist Jim Suptic was home in-between tour dates for the final tour of The Get Up Kids. The album was shelved, however, because the band intended for it to be the first release on Curb Appeal Records, the record label started by Jim Suptic. Once the label was up and running in mid-2006, the band released the album, gaining significant coverage from retailers such as Best Buy.

Track listing

Personnel

Band
Jim Suptic – guitar, vocals
J.D.Warnock – guitar, vocals, keyboards
Billy Brimblecom – drums
Brian Everard – bass

Additional musicians
Chris Tolle – guitar on "Maybe Just Maybe"

Production
Michael Fossenkemper – mastering
Ed Rose – mixing, production

References

Blackpool Lights albums
2006 albums
Albums produced by Ed Rose